Scott O'Leary (born 17 December 1977) is an Australian cricketer. He played in seven first-class and three List A matches for Queensland in 2000/01.

See also
 List of Queensland first-class cricketers

References

External links
 

1977 births
Living people
Australian cricketers
Queensland cricketers
Cricketers from Brisbane